Monster is a town in the Dutch province of South Holland.

The village of Monster has a population of around 11,580.
The statistical area Monster, which also can include the surrounding countryside, has a population of around 14,540.

The former municipality of Monster also included the towns, Poeldijk and Ter Heijde. Monster and Ter Heijde are towns on the North Sea coast and have a popular beach.

History
In the 13th century a great deal of the Westland, Loosduinen and The Hague were administered by Monster. When The Hague came to be constructed, a split was made in Haag-ambacht and Half-Loosduinen. The latter village was separated from Monster in 1812. Remains of the former glory can still be seen between The Hague and Monster at such estates as Ockenburgh, Bloemendaal, Solleveld and Langeveld.

There is a great deal of uncertainty over the origin of the name "Monster". It is probably derived from the Latin monasterium, meaning monastery. The name was also used for the ground that belonged to a monastery. Another explanation was that Monster was derived from the old-Dutch word monster, which meant amongst others "big church" (from Latin: monstrum), which is supported by the fact that Monster had in those days one of the largest churches in the area.

Monster was previously a destination for pilgrimage, because Machutus parish possessed some relics of its patron Machutus, who is also known as Machuut. People came to be healed of the "falling sickness", which was possibly epilepsy.

Notable people 
 John I, Lord of Polanen (c. 1285–1342), Lord of Polanen, De Lek and Breda
 Arnold Vinnius (1588–1657), jurist
 Gerard Schouw (b. 1965), politician
 Arantxa Rus (b. 1990), tennis player
 Yvette Broch (b.1990), handball player

Image gallery

References

Municipalities of the Netherlands disestablished in 2004
Populated places in South Holland
Former municipalities of South Holland
Westland (municipality), Netherlands